Mount Huethawali is a  summit located in the Grand Canyon, in Coconino County of northern Arizona, US. It is situated 3.5 miles due east of Explorers Monument, 1.5 mile west of Grand Scenic Divide, and immediately southwest of Huxley Terrace.

The summit dome is composed of cream-colored Permian Coconino Sandstone. This sandstone, which is the third-youngest stratum in the Grand Canyon, was deposited 265 million years ago as sand dunes. Below the Coconino Sandstone is reddish, slope-forming, Permian Hermit Formation, which in turn overlays the Pennsylvanian-Permian Supai Group. Further down are strata of the cliff-forming  Mississippian Redwall Limestone, Cambrian Tonto Group, and finally Proterozoic Unkar Group at river level.

According to the Köppen climate classification system, Mount Huethawali is located in a cold semi-arid climate zone.

History
The first ascent of the summit was made in August 1898 by William Wallace Bass and George Wharton James. James originally named it Mount Observation, but wrote that Indians called this mountain "Hue-tha-wa-li" (pronounced "we-the-wally"), which means White Rock Mountain. Some sources state that "Huethawali" is the Native American word for "observation point", while other sources state it translates as "white tower" or "white rock mountain" in the Havasupai language. This butte's name was officially adopted in 1932 by the U.S. Board on Geographic Names.

Gallery

See also
 Geology of the Grand Canyon area
 History of the Grand Canyon area

References

External links 

 Weather forecast: National Weather Service
 Mount Huethawali photo by Harvey Butchart

Grand Canyon
Landforms of Coconino County, Arizona
Colorado Plateau
Grand Canyon National Park
North American 1000 m summits
Sandstone formations of the United States
Grand Canyon, South Rim
Grand Canyon, South Rim (west)